Reggane Airport  is a public use airport located 7 nm east of Reggane, Adrar, Algeria.

References

External links 
 OurAirports - Reggane
 Great Circle Mapper - Reggane
 

Airports in Algeria
Buildings and structures in Adrar Province